The Biak massacre was the killing of West Papuan pro-independence demonstrators on the island of Biak, Papua Province, Indonesia. 

According to Elsham Papua, a local human rights organization, 8 people were killed and a further 32 bodies were found near Biak in the following days. The Free Papua Movement claimed that around 150 people were killed.

See also
 List of massacres in Indonesia

Notes

References

External links and further reading
 
 Tim Advokasi Hak Azasi Manusia untuk Rakyat Irian Jaya, "Laporan Pelanggaran HAM di Biak" (undated report)
 

Massacres in Indonesia
Papua conflict
History of Papua (province)
1998 in Indonesia